Kokuyevo is a rural locality (a village) in Gorodishchenskoye Rural Settlement, Nyuksensky District, Vologda Oblast, Russia. The population was 35 as of 2002.

Geography 
Kokuyevo is located 57 km southwest of Nyuksenitsa (the district's administrative centre) by road. Verkhovye is the nearest rural locality.

References 

Rural localities in Nyuksensky District